The Creamsicle is a cocktail made with vodka, cream, orange liquor, milk and simple syrup. It is a sweet, creamy cocktail that can be served as a shot or a float made with orange soda and ice cream. Modern variations of the cocktail may replace the milk with orange juice, and use a vanilla vodka or other dessert flavored vodka like whipped cream vodka. If orange juice is used, the cocktail is shaken.

The Savoy Cocktail Book contains a recipe for a similar cocktail called a "Buds special", but omits the vodka. The three ingredient cocktail is made simply with Angostura bitters, sweet cream and Cointreau. This creamy cocktail is stirred, not shaken.

References

Cocktails with vodka
Cocktails with milk
Cocktails with triple sec or curaçao
Cocktails with orange juice
Cocktails with Angostura bitters
Three-ingredient cocktails
Creamy cocktails
Sweet cocktails
Citrus cocktails
Cocktails with ice cream
Shooters (drinks)